SMK Cochrane (formerly known as SMK Jalan Cochrane or Cochrane Road School, C.R.S.) is a secondary school in Kuala Lumpur, Malaysia. Founded in 1957 to provide secondary education to pupils who live near Cochrane Road. The school was inaugurated on 1 September 1965 by Datuk Harun Idris, Menteri Besar of Selangor at that time. It offers classes for students from Form 1 to Form 6. Since 1994, the school changed it status from a boys school to a co-ed secondary school.

It was situated on Jalan Cochrane before the school was relocated to a new building in Jalan Shahbandar in late 2004. The school was renamed to SMK Cochrane as it is no longer situated on Jalan Cochrane. The new school building was official opened on 4 February 2005 by Dato' Seri Hishammuddin Hussein, Minister of Education.
The school, like the road it was once situated on before, was named after the 17th British Resident of Perak, Charles Walter Hamilton Cochrane.

The old structure on Jalan Cochrane is now called the Cochrane Youth Sports Centre dedicated to the development of young talented sportsmen. The move received many objections initially as many old boys of the school firmly believe that the location of the school and the huge football field that surrounded it embodied the true spirit of the education institution.

Notable alumni
 Alvin Wong 王竣- Malaysian Chinese Actor
 Azman Adnan - former Malaysian footballer
 Chow Kon Yeow 曹观友  - Chief Minister Of Penang
 Indi Nadarajah - Malaysian actor and comedian
 Izara Aisyah- actress
 Tuan Danial - actor
 Lim Kok Wing- Founder of Limkokwing University of Creative Technology
 Mohd Safee Mohd Sali - Malaysian football striker, AFF Suzuki Cup 2010 top scorer
 Roslin Hashim - former Badminton national player 1992
 Shweta Sekhon - Miss Malaysia World 2016 and Miss Universe Malaysia 2019 titleholder.
 Soon Mustafa - Olympian (Hockey)

 Andrew David - POLITICIAN - National MIC DEPUTY YOUTH LEADER , National MIC YOUTH BRIGADE LEADER , Malaysian Kabbadi Federation Vice President

External links

References

Secondary schools in Kuala Lumpur
1957 establishments in Malaya
Educational institutions established in 1957
Secondary schools in Malaysia